Mercado is a Caracas Metro station on Line 3. It was opened on 9 January 2010 on the section of the line between El Valle and La Rinconada, which started operations earlier without intermediate stations. The station is located between Coche and La Rinconada.

References

Caracas Metro stations
2010 establishments in Venezuela
Railway stations opened in 2010